Marosa di Giorgio (née María Rosa di Giorgio Médici, Salto, 1932 – Montevideo, 2004) was a Uruguayan poet and novelist.

Marosa di Giorgio is considered one of the most singular voices in Latin America. Critics tend to agree that her writing is greatly influenced by European surrealism, although her vocabulary, style, and imagery are uniquely her own. Her work deals predominately with the imaginary world of childhood and nature.

In the past few years, Latin American critics such as Hugo Achugar, Luis Bravo, Leonardo Garet, Sylvia Guerra, María Alejandra Minelli, and María Rosa Olivera-Williams have explored Marosa Di Giorgio's writing. Uruguayan poet Roberto Echavarren published in 1991 "Transplatinos", which offers an excellent introduction to Di Giorgio's writing. 
Selected poems from The March Hare have been translated into English by K.A. Kopple and published in the 1995 by Exact Change Yearbook. An article discussing gender politics, parody, and desire (as elaborated by Gilles Deleuze) also written by K.A. Kopple appeared in March 2000 in the Journal of Latin American Cultural Studies. In'Identity, Nation, Discourse: Latin American Women Writers and Artists, edited by Claire Taylor (Cambridge Scholars Publishing, 2009), Soledad Montañez  opens up a new discussion of Di Giorgio's erotic writing. Montañez shows how "Di Giorgio's erotic prose illustrates the representation and performance of patriarchal hierarchy as a perverse comedy, creating a genre that constructs gender narratives in order to undermine the patriarchal system from within." Montañez also affirms that "The effect achieved in Marosa's radicalised narrative is ultimately a mocking performance, a burlesque discourse that reveals and denounces domination and power. Through a perverse representation, Marosa exposes the complicated matter of culturally constructed sexual norms and develops a writing that is at the same time disturbing and astonishing" (2009: 158).

In 1982, she received the Fraternity Award for literature.

Translator Adam Giannelli is currently working on the English translation of her poems.

Works
 Poemas (1954)
 Humo (1955)
 Druida (1959)
 Historial de las violetas (1965)
 Magnolia (1968)
 La guerra de los huertos (1971)
 Está en llamas el jardín natal (1975)
 Papeles Salvajes (recompilation)
 Clavel y tenebrario (1979)
 La liebre de marzo (1981)
 Mesa de esmeralda (1985)
 La falena (1989)
 Membrillo de Lusana (1989)
 Misales (1993)
 Camino de las pedrerías (1997)
 Reina Amelia (1999)
 Diamelas a Clementina Médici (2000)
 Rosa mística (2003)

English translations
 The History of Violets tr. Jeannine Marie Pitas. Ugly Duckling Presse, New York, 2010.  (Historial de las violetas)
 Jasmine for Clementina Medici tr. Peter Boyle. Vagabond Press, Sydney & Tokyo, 2017.  (Diamelas a Clementina Médici)
 I Remember Nightfall tr. Jeannine Marie Pitas. Ugly Duckling Presse, New York, 2017.  (Historial de las violetas, Magnolia, La guerra de los huertos & Está en llamas el jardín natal)

References

Uruguayan women novelists
Uruguayan novelists
20th-century Uruguayan poets
1932 births
2004 deaths
20th-century novelists
Uruguayan women poets
20th-century Uruguayan women writers
Fraternity Award